Alvermann is a surname. Notable people with the surname include:

Donna Alvermann, American educator and researcher
Gustav Alvermann (1897–1942), German World War II military officer